Kong Xueer (born April 30, 1996), also known as Snow Kong, is a Chinese singer and actress. She is best known for finishing eighth in the iQiyi survival reality show Youth With You 2, becoming a member of girl group THE9. She is also a former member of the girl group LadyBees, along with fellow THE9 member Liu Yuxin.

Career

2012–2019: Career beginnings
In 2012, Kong participated in a talent show organized by the South Korean company JYP Entertainment and was selected as a trainee. She left the company in 2015. In March 2016, she participated in Zhejiang TV's Chinese girl group survival reality show Lady Bees. On May 28, 2016, she stood out in the final battle of the program and became a member of LadyBees.

In March 2018, Kong participated in the iQiyi dance reality show competition program Hot Blood Dance Crew. In November 2018, LadyBees released the single and mini-album entitled Queen Bee. The group disbanded in 2019.

2020–present: Debut with THE9 and solo endeavors

In 2020, Kong represented Mountain Top Entertainment alongside Zhao Xiaotang on the reality survival show Youth With You 2. On May 30, 2020, Kong placed 8th with a total of 4,001,966 votes in the final episode thus making her included in final group lineup. She officially debuted as a member of THE9 on August 10, 2020.

Discography

Singles

Composition credits

Filmography

Films

Television series

Television shows

Notes

References

External links

Living people
1996 births
Chinese idols
THE9 members
Actresses from Hubei
People from Qianjiang
Singers from Hubei
Chinese Mandopop singers
Youth With You contestants
Chinese television actresses
21st-century Chinese actresses
21st-century Chinese singers
21st-century Chinese women singers